Étienne-François de Lantier (1 October 1734, Marseille – 31 January 1826, Marseille) was an 18th-century French writer and playwright.

Works 
 1768: L’Impatient, one-act comedy,  Online
 1782: Le Flatteur comedy in 5 acts composed with La Reynière : Online
 1784: Travaux de l’abbé Mouche
 1798: Voyages d’Anténor en Grèce et en Asie  avec des notions sur l’Égypte, Online  tome 1,  tome 2 & tome 3
 1803: Les voyageurs en Suisse 
 1809: Voyage en Espagne du chevalier Saint-Gervais, officier français
 1817: Recueil de poésies
 1825: Geoffroy Rudel ou le troubadour poème en 8 chants, Online

His complete works were published in Paris at Auguste Desrez and Arthus Bertrand in 1836–1837, reworked and collected by Pierre-Joseph Charrin, preceded by a biographical notice by Gaston de Flotte.

Bibliography 
 Jean Chrétien Ferdinand  Hoefer: Nouvelle biographie générale depuis les temps les plus reculés jusqu'à nos jours, Firmin -Didot 
 Jean Baptiste Lautard:  Histoire de l'Académie de Marseille, depuis sa fondation en 1726 

18th-century French male writers
18th-century French dramatists and playwrights
1734 births
Writers from Marseille
1826 deaths